Kashiwado Risuke (柏戸 利助, 1783 – December 3, 1828) was a sumo wrestler from Goshogawara, Aomori, Japan.

Career
Kashiwado was born in Aomori and went to Edo in 1806, joining Isenoumi stable. He was given the name Kashiwado and worked under the Hirosaki Domain. His highest rank was ōzeki. He won 16 tournaments in the top makuuchi division, but his top division win ratio was not so high at .810, compared with Tanikaze (.949) and Onogawa (.917).

In June 1823, the Gojo family granted yokozuna licences to Kashiwado and his rival Tamagaki, but he rejected his. The reason has been said to be that he was afraid that this would cause conflict with the Yoshida family. Tamagaki also rejected the licence.  The following year Tamagaki suddenly died, and his death shocked Kashiwado. In January 1825, Kashiwado lost three consecutive bouts and retired.

Kahiwado was not promoted to yokozuna but because 20th Yoshida Oikaze had heard of his case, he decided to issue a license to Ōnomatsu Midorinosuke in 1828, making Ōnomatsu the first yokozuna in 39 years.

Top division record
The actual time the tournaments were held during the year in this period often varied.
 
 
    
    
  
 
    
    
  

    
    
  

    
    
  

    
    
  

    
    
  

    
    
  

    
    
  

    
    
  

    
    
  

    
    
  

    
    
  

    
    
  

    
    
  

    
  

*Championships for the best record in a tournament were not recognized or awarded before the 1909 summer tournament, and the unofficial championships above are historically conferred. For more information, see yūshō.

See also
List of past sumo wrestlers
Glossary of sumo terms

References

External links
 Kashiwado Risuke Tournament results

1783 births
1828 deaths
People from Goshogawara
Japanese sumo wrestlers
Ōzeki
Sumo people from Aomori Prefecture